Sheila Margaret Rutherford (born 15 June 1935) is an English former cricketer who played primarily as a bowler. She appeared in four Test matches for England in 1960 and 1961, all against South Africa. She played domestic cricket for various North of England composite XIs, as well as her home county of Northumberland.

References

External links
 
 

1935 births
Living people
Cricketers from Northumberland
England women Test cricketers
Northumberland women cricketers
People from Seghill